Neotrioza is a genus of true bugs belonging to the family Triozidae.

Species:

Neotrioza machilae 
Neotrioza machili 
Neotrioza shuiliensis

References

Triozidae